The Blohm & Voss BV 40 was a German glider fighter designed to attack Allied bomber formations during the time of the bombing raids over Nazi Germany.

Design
The BV 40 was the smallest glider that could accommodate an armoured cockpit and two cannon with limited ammunition. By eliminating the engine and lying the pilot in a prone position (i.e. on his front), the cross-sectional area of the fuselage was much reduced, making the BV 40 harder for bomber gunners to hit.

The plane was designed to use non-strategic materials and to be built in as short a time as possible by non-skilled workers. The fuselage was constructed almost entirely of wood. It was of conventional layout, the glider had a high-mounted, straight untapered wing with a similarly-shaped tailplane mounted on the fin just above the fuselage.
The pilot lay prone in an armoured steel cockpit in the nose of the aircraft.
that gave the aircraft a blunt-nosed appearance.

Two 30 mm (1.18 in) MK 108 cannon were mounted in the wing roots.

There was no conventional undercarriage. A twin-wheeled dolly was used for take-off and dropped once the glider was airborne. A skid under the nose was lowered for landing.

History
The BV 40 interceptor glider was conceived by Dr Richard Vogt, chief designer and technical director of Blohm & Voss, as a low-cost emergency solution to the problem of the Allied bomber formations which were devastating Germany in the latter half of World War II. It was to be towed by a Messerschmitt Bf 109 to operational altitude and released above the Allied bombers' combat box. Once released, it would dive down at a sharp angle towards the enemy bomber fleet. During its short attack time, the BV 40 would fire its weapons, then glide back to earth.
Several prototypes were completed and flown, towed behind a Messerschmitt Bf 110. The first flight took place in May 1944. It was found the craft could reach  and it was thought to have the potential to go far faster. Various changes to the requirement and to the design were discussed, before the project was cancelled later in the year. In all, seven aircraft were completed and five of them flown.
Owing to the potential dangers for the pilot inherent in the operation of this precarious aircraft, the BV 40 is sometimes listed as a suicide weapon, but it was not intended as such.

Specifications (BV 40)

See also

References

Further reading

External links

1940s German fighter aircraft
Glider aircraft
BV 040
Prone pilot aircraft
Aircraft first flown in 1944